Konstantinos Dimokostoulas was a Greek politician.

Biography 
He was born in Sourpi, Almyros and was a lawyer. He was elected MP for Fthiotida and Phocis in the November 1910 Greek legislative election and was reelected, as MP for Larisa, in 1912 and May 1915.

References

External links 
 Konstantinos Dimokostoulaw in Pandektis, by the National Hellenic Research Foundation

MPs of Larissa
People from Sourpi
Greek MPs 1910–1912
Greek MPs 1912–1915
Greek MPs 1915, 1917–1920